The 2017–18 James Madison Dukes women's basketball team represents James Madison University during the 2017–18 NCAA Division I women's basketball season. The Dukes, led by second year head coach Sean O'Regan, play their home games at the James Madison University Convocation Center and were members of the Colonial Athletic Association (CAA). They finished the season 23–11, 16–2 in CAA play to win the CAA regular season title with Drexel. They advanced to the semifinals of the CAA women's tournament where they lost to Elon. They received an at-large bid to the Women's National Invitation Tournament where they defeated East Tennessee State and Radford in the first and second rounds before losing to West Virginia in the third round.

Previous season
They finished the season 26–9, 15–3 in CAA play to finish in second place. They advanced to the championship game CAA women's tournament where they lost to Elon. They received an automatic bid to the Women's National Invitation Tournament where they defeated Radford and Virginia in the first and second rounds before losing to Villanova in the third round.

Roster

Schedule

|-
!colspan=9 style=| Exhibition

|-
!colspan=9 style=| Non-conference regular season

|-
!colspan=9 style=| CAA regular season

|-
!colspan=9 style=| CAA Women's Tournament

|-
!colspan=9 style=| WNIT

Rankings
2017–18 NCAA Division I women's basketball rankings

See also
2017–18 James Madison Dukes men's basketball team

References

James Madison Dukes women's basketball seasons
James Madison
James Madison